Abraham Lewis Kaminstein (May 13, 1912—September 10, 1977) was the sixth United States Register of Copyright. He first entered the role in an acting capacity after the death of his predecessor, Arthur Fisher in November 1960. Librarian of Congress L. Quincy Mumford officially appointed him on December 24, 1960 and he served until August 31, 1971, retiring due to poor health. George D. Cary replaced him.

Starting in the 1950s, Kaminstein was instrumental in initiating the early research that eventually culminated in a general revision of copyright law in the United States, the Copyright Act of 1976. He was a major delegate of the United States to meetings of parties to the Berne Convention and the Universal Copyright Convention.

References

1912 births
1977 deaths
United States Registers of Copyright
City College of New York alumni
Harvard Law School alumni